Tunçer Kılınç (born 25 April 1938) is a retired Turkish general. He was Secretary-General of the National Security Council from 2001 to 2003. He was a defendant in the Ergenekon trials; in August 2013 he was sentenced to 13 years in prison.

At a 2007 meeting of the Atatürkist Thought Association he said that Turkey should leave NATO.

He graduated from the Turkish Military Academy in 1960 and the Army War College (Kara Harp Akademisi) in 1973.

References

1938 births
People from Kars
Turkish Army generals
Living people
Secretaries General of the National Security Council (Turkey)
Turkish Military Academy alumni
Army War College (Turkey) alumni
People convicted in the Ergenekon trials